Robert Hawkey (19 March 1915 – 26 January 1976) was a British athlete. He competed in the men's triple jump at the 1948 Summer Olympics.

References

1915 births
1976 deaths
Athletes (track and field) at the 1948 Summer Olympics
British male triple jumpers
Olympic athletes of Great Britain
Place of birth missing